Efren Echeverria (4 March 1932 – 19 June 2018) was a Paraguayan musician guitarist, composer, and compiler.

Childhood and Youth 

When Efren was nine years old, a neighbor, Eusebio Cantero, taught him the first chords on guitar. With him, he learned the authentic pieces of folk repertoire of anonymous authors. Thus, from an early age, Paraguayan music became familiar to him; therefore to own a guitar became a passionate desire of his childhood. And not a long time passed until the desired instrument came to his life. Already in his teens, Echeverria became part of the act placed in any "Musiqueada" (musical parties) that was done in his homeland.

Soon Efren takes over the serenades of the place, always pushing the guitar and sometimes up the violin or accordion with buttons. His repertoire covered everything that the public from the area knew could appreciate.

First Steps 

As the young Efren Echeverria understood, he could not survive with music as a single work, he was an employee and was able get the best notes from the musical instruments; there was no tayï (a typical tree from Paraguay) that could resist to his blunt axe.

The musician worked as employee in the area of Curuguaty by the year 1950. In 1960 he settled in the city of Asuncion, capital of Paraguay.

In the 1970s, he came to participate in the emerging music festivals and television. In those days he began to arouse interest in the capital for his original compositions and his special way of tapping and ripping the guitar simultaneously.

A very personal style 

Kamba'í Echeverria says that his unique style of simultaneous strumming and marking arose from the need to act alone, especially in the serenades, to accommodate the budgets of his hometown and as a product of admiration for the great guitar as concertmasters Cayo Sila Godoy and Felipe Sosa.

Meeting with professional musicians 

Near the truck that Efren adopted as the first refuge in Asuncion, lived the musician Ramon Vargas Colman, who by then was temporarily separated from her musical partner Andres Saldivar Basin. It was then when Efren became part of the group of Vargas Colmán with harpist Edmundo "Nenito" Medina and others. In parallel, he presented a radio program on Radio Ñandutí. Some time later, he accompanied the musician Severo Nunez Benitez and his group “Los Jilgeros” who made radio programs for Radio Paraguay, Chaco Boreal Station and the National Radio. With them he toured to  Argentina and Brazil.

It was at the Pettengil family home, in the city of Itaguá, where he met the musician and composer Eladio Martinez "El Grande", whom he would fill another rich stage of experience at festivals and on television.

Kamba'í has worked on other duties to support his family. For several years was a doorman of the Ministry of Health and for a long time he had the same job as a security guard during the night at a television company.

Distinctions 

The Cultural Center of the Republic El Cabildo awarded Efren Echeverria the prize "Masters of art" in the category of music in 2007. He shared this high distinction with Ramiro Dominguez in literature, Carlos Colombino in visual arts, Reina Menchaca in dance and Carlos Gomez in theatre.

Master of Arts 

The distinction "Masters of Art" is a recognition of prominent artists and intellectuals in cultural management and promotion of artistic events. The choice rests with a jury composed of advisers from the Center.

An important site of the Cabildo is the gallery with a photograph of them so to pay tribute to the life of the great artistic personalities of Paraguay.

This time were distinguished: Efren Echeverria. Guitarist, composer and compiler.

Tributes received 

Efren `Kamba` i `Echeverria and singer and composer Quemil Yambay, have been honored to receive life in a well-deserved tribute to the appellation of" Living Human Treasures ", in a massive act performed at the Teatro Municipal. The event was organized by the Paraguayan National Commission for Cooperation with the Unesco, who handed Honors consisting of gold medals and monetary contribution for both artists.

The words were flattering and honored the figure of both men. They were named "Living Human Treasures" through a project presented last year by the cultural sponsor Mario Garcia Siani, the United Nations for Education, Scientific and Cultural Organization (Unesco).

The guitarist Efren Echeverria said that despite the cold weather, he was very happy. "I was in heaven at that time and it is the first time I do this kind of recognition in my country. And the best thing is that everything is done while I am alive and that encourages me to continue, because I see that my work is valued. It is a great thing for me and I thank them all for this recognition. I never imagined this could happen. But I am sure that what they told me is true, because I know what I am worth and what I do with the guitar, because it took me a long time and it is unique. So far I have not found someone who plays guitar like I do and keep that in mind. I did not study and learned to play on my own, "said the guitarist.

On the particular tuning of his guitar to play its songs, the artist said that he tuned it in G, meaning that in the first three ropes and in the final ones he tuned in this note with the respective chord. “My brother taught me that pitch, Catalino Echeverria, because he saw a musician who played well in Puerto Casado, where he worked producing tannin. The sound was recorded in his mind and told me this, which I have ever forgotten. Then I tried it and I liked it "He said.

Works 

The composer created many works for guitar. Some recreate sounds of animals with great fidelity. These include:
 "Ruguasu Kokoro."
 "Yaguai Kare."
 "Itaverá."
 "Guata yeruti."
 "Taita Jose."
 "Belénpe guare."
 "Vaka ra'y chapelo", among others.

The musician joined numerous folk groups, although it is now recognized and admired for his solo interpretation of the Paraguayan folk music.

He has compiled dozens of compositions he has heard since childhood and that for professional ethics and honesty he has not registered in his name. Elias has recorded discs so far four long-term discs and included them in many of these popular grounds next to the popular creations: Yagua'í care and Ryguazú Cocore.

In the 70's was when he made many music festivals and on television so that more was to tap and ripping guitar.

Bibliography
 Kamba'i Echeverria
 Viva Paraguay

References

External links
 UIP.com
 Centro Cultural de la República El Cabildo

1932 births
2018 deaths
Paraguayan classical guitarists
Male guitarists
People from San Pedro Department, Paraguay
20th-century classical musicians